Moutamba (can also be written as Mutamba) is a district in the Niari Region of south-western Republic of the Congo. The capital lies at Mossendjo.

The district was created from Mossendjo District in 1984.

Towns and villages
Mossendjo
Moutamba

References

Districts of the Republic of the Congo